Maximillian Oppenheimer (6 May 1902 – 26 March 1957), known as Max Ophüls or simply Ophuls, was a German-French film director who worked in Germany (1931–1933), France (1933–1940 and 1950–1957), and the United States (1947–1950). He made nearly 30 films, the latter ones being especially notable: La Ronde (1950), Le Plaisir (1952), The Earrings of Madame de… (1953) and Lola Montès (1955). He was credited as Max Opuls on several of his American films, including The Reckless Moment, Caught, Letter from an Unknown Woman, and The Exile. The annual Filmfestival Max Ophüls Preis in Saarbrücken is named after him.

Life

Youth and early career 
Max Ophüls was born in Saarbrücken, Germany, the son of Leopold Oppenheimer, a Jewish textile manufacturer and owner of several textile shops in Germany, and his wife Helene Oppenheimer (née Bamberger). He took the pseudonym Ophüls during the early part of his theatrical career so that, should he fail, it wouldn't embarrass his father.

Initially envisioning an acting career, he started as a stage actor in 1919 and played at the Aachen Theatre from 1921 to 1923. He then worked as a theater director, becoming the first director at the city theater of Dortmund. Ophüls moved into theatre production in 1924. He became creative director of the Burgtheater in Vienna in 1926.  he turned to film production in 1929, when he became a dialogue director under Anatole Litvak at UFA in Berlin. He worked throughout Germany and directed his first film in 1931, the comedy short Dann schon lieber Lebertran (literally In This Case, Rather Cod-Liver Oil).

Of his early films, the most acclaimed is Liebelei (1933), which included a number of the characteristic elements for which he was to become known: luxurious sets, a feminist attitude, and a duel between a younger and an older man.

It was at the Burgtheater that Ophüls met the actress Hilde Wall. They were married in 1926.

Exile and post-war career 
Predicting the Nazi ascendancy, Ophüls, a Jew, fled to France in 1933 after the Reichstag fire and became a French citizen in 1938. After the fall of France to Germany, he travelled through Switzerland and Italy. In July 1941, before leaving for the United States, he stayed in Portugal, in Estoril, at Casa Mar e Sol. Once in Hollywood, championed by director Preston Sturges, a longtime fan, he directed a number of distinguished films.

His first Hollywood film was the Douglas Fairbanks, Jr. vehicle, The Exile (1947). Ophüls' Letter from an Unknown Woman (1948), derived from a Stefan Zweig novella, is the most highly regarded of the American films. Caught (1949), and The Reckless Moment (1949) followed, before his return to Europe in 1950.

Back in France, he directed and collaborated on the adaptation of Arthur Schnitzler's La Ronde (1950), which won the 1951 BAFTA Award for Best Film, and Lola Montès (1955) starring Martine Carol and Peter Ustinov, as well as Le Plaisir and The Earrings of Madame de... (1953), the latter with Danielle Darrieux and Charles Boyer, which capped his career.  Ophüls died from rheumatic heart disease on 26 March 1957 in Hamburg, while shooting interiors on The Lovers of Montparnasse, and was buried in Le Père Lachaise Cemetery in Paris. This final film was completed by his friend Jacques Becker.

Ophüls's son Marcel Ophüls became a documentary-film maker, director of The Sorrow and the Pity and other films examining the nature of political power.

Style 
All his works feature his distinctive smooth camera movements, complex crane and dolly sweeps, and tracking shots.

Many of his films inspired filmmakers like Paul Thomas Anderson, who gave an introduction on the restored DVD of The Earrings of Madame de... (1953).

Some of his films are narrated from the point of view of the female protagonist. Film scholars have analyzed films such as Liebelei (1933), Letter from an Unknown Woman (1948), and Madame de... (1953) as examples of the woman's film genre.
Nearly all of his female protagonists had names beginning with "L" (Leonora, Lisa, Lucia, Louise, Lola, etc.)

Actor James Mason, who worked with Ophüls on two films, wrote a short poem about the director's love for tracking shots and elaborate camera movements:
A shot that does not call for tracks
Is agony for poor dear Max,
Who, separated from his dolly,
Is wrapped in deepest melancholy.
Once, when they took away his crane,
I thought he'd never smile again.

Filmography 

 Also worked on Les amants de Montparnasse (1958), before his death.

Bibliography 
 Max Ophüls (1959), Spiel im Dasein. Eine Rückblende. Mit einem Nachwort von Hilde Ophüls und einer Einführung von Friedrich Luft, sowie achtzehn Abbildungen (autobiography), Stuttgart: Henry Goverts Verlag (posthumously published).

See also 
List of German-speaking Academy Award winners and nominees

References

Citations

Sources

Further reading 
 Alan Larson Williams (1977, reprinted 1980, 1992), Max Ophüls and the Cinema of Desire: Style and Spectacle in Four Films, 1948–1955, Dissertations on Film series, New York: Arno Press (reprint).  |  
 Susan M. White (1995), The Cinema of Max Ophüls: Magisterial Vision and the Figure of Woman, New York: Columbia University Press.  |  
 Lutz Bacher (1996), Max Ophüls in the Hollywood Studios, Rutgers, New Jersey: Rutgers University Press.  |  
 Melinda Camber Porter (1993), "Through Parisian Eyes: Reflections on Contemporary French Arts and Culture", Da Capo Press. |

External links 

 Dossier about Max Ophüls (edited by Toni D'Angela), on La furia umana, n° 9, 2011, texts (English, French, Italian) by Raymond Bellour, Chris Fujiwara, Leland Monk, Gaylyn Studlar, Susan M. White, Alain Masson, and others. 

Max Ophuls Bibliography (via UC Berkeley Media Resources Center)
Senses of Cinema Essay by Tag Gallagher
Max Ophüls Award

1902 births
1957 deaths
Burials at Père Lachaise Cemetery
French film directors
Film directors from Saarland
Jewish emigrants from Nazi Germany to France
Jewish French writers
Jewish artists
Jewish film people
People from the Rhine Province
People from Saarbrücken